St. Elizabeth Medical Center may refer to:

 St. Elizabeth's Medical Center (Boston) in Boston, Massachusetts
 St. Elizabeth Medical Center North in Covington, Kentucky
 St. Elizabeth Medical Center South in Edgewood, Kentucky
 St. Elizabeth Medical Center Grant County in Williamstown, Kentucky, see List of hospitals in Kentucky
 St. Elizabeth Medical Center (Utica) in Utica, New York
 St. Elizabeth's Medical Center (Wabasha) in Wabasha, Minnesota
 St. Elizabeth Regional Medical Center in Lincoln, Nebraska
 Franciscan Health Lafayette Central, formerly St. Elizabeth Medical Center, in Lafayette, Indiana

See also
 St. Elizabeth Hospital (disambiguation)

Trauma centers